The Cook is a 1918 American two-reel silent comedy film written by, directed by, and starring Roscoe "Fatty" Arbuckle and featuring Buster Keaton and Al St. John. The movie is a slapstick comedy and focuses on goings-on at a high-end restaurant with Arbuckle as the Cook and Keaton as the Waiter.

The film is notable for a scene spoofing the 1918 Theda Bara film Salomé, with Arbuckle dancing around with a length of sausage links and pots and pans. It also contains many of Arbuckle's favorite food gags and some well-received work by Keaton. It was filmed at The Pike and the Balboa Amusement Producing Company.

Plot
Fatty is the head chef at the "Bull Pup" restaurant where Keaton serves as the head waiter. One evening while service is in full flow Keaton and Fatty entertain the crowd with their dancing (despite breaking most of the plates and bottles in the restaurant in the process). The fun is soon spoiled when a vagrant (St. John), referred to as "Holdup Man" in the film's credits, comes in and begins ruining everyone's good time and dancing with the waitress (Alice Lake) against her will. Fatty, Keaton and the manager are no match for Holdup Man but he is subsequently scared off by Luke, Fatty's dog. Later, Fatty and Keaton join a pair of gentlemen in the restaurant for a big plate of spaghetti, not being able to replicate the correct way of eating it they resort to their own methods of eating one string at a time and cutting the pasta with scissors to make it shorter.

The next day Fatty plans a fishing trip with Luke while Keaton simultaneously takes the waitress on a date to the amusement park. Fatty takes a shortcut through the park and knocks several people out with his exceptionally long fishing rod before arriving on the beach. The waitress gets separated from Keaton and is chased around the park by Holdup Man and ends up falling off the top of a roller coaster, falling into the sea. Holdup man is chased off by Luke yet again and Fatty and Keaton attempt to rescue the waitress but find that the key to a flotation device is "in a courthouse one mile east". Acting fast, they grab a rope to throw to the waitress but Keaton falls off the pier still holding the rope and drags Fatty in with him.

Preservation status and restoration
The movie was believed to be a lost film for several decades before a damaged nitrate print was uncovered in the Norwegian Film Archive in 1998 in an unmarked canister with A Reckless Romeo (1917). Another print, with 600 additional feet of footage (about eight minutes), was found in the EYE Film Institute Netherlands in 2002, and the two were combined, using the synopsis from the Library of Congress as a guide to create the restored version, although there are still missing scenes. This version is currently available on the DVD The Cook and Other Treasures.

Cast
 Roscoe 'Fatty' Arbuckle - Chef
 Buster Keaton - Assistant Chef
 Al St. John - Holdup Man
 Alice Lake - Waitress / Cashier
 Glen Cavender
 Luke the Dog

See also
 List of American films of 1918
 Fatty Arbuckle filmography
 Buster Keaton filmography
 List of rediscovered films

References

External links

 
 
 
 The Cook at the International Buster Keaton Society

1918 films
American black-and-white films
American silent short films
Films directed by Roscoe Arbuckle
1918 comedy films
1918 short films
Silent American comedy films
Articles containing video clips
Films with screenplays by Roscoe Arbuckle
1910s rediscovered films
American comedy short films
Rediscovered American films
1910s American films
1910s English-language films